Charles Lopez (February 29, 1968 – March 9, 2004), better known by his stage name Rust Epique, was an American guitarist and painter, who performed with the bands Crazy Town and pre)Thing.

Biography
In 1999, Rust Epique joined Crazy Town, a rap metal band from Los Angeles. Despite his success with Crazy Town, Epique quit the band as a result of various disagreements with his bandmates. In 2003, V2 Records signed Epique to work with a band called Pre)Thing. They released their debut album, 22nd Century Lifestyle, in 2004. 

Rust Epique died of an aortic rupture at his home in Las Vegas in 2004.

References

1968 births
2004 deaths
Rap rock musicians
Nu metal singers
Musicians from Stockton, California
20th-century American musicians